Makresh Rocks (‘Skali Makresh’ ska-'li 'ma-kresh) are a group of rocks situated  northeast of Treklyano Island off the northeast coast of Robert Island, South Shetland Islands.

The feature is named after the settlement of Makresh in northwestern Bulgaria.  Salient Rock was descriptively named Roca Saliente by the Chilean Antarctic Expedition and charted in 1951.

Location

See also 
 Composite Antarctic Gazetteer
 List of Antarctic islands south of 60° S
 SCAR
 Territorial claims in Antarctica

Map
 L.L. Ivanov. Antarctica: Livingston Island and Greenwich, Robert, Snow and Smith Islands. Scale 1:120000 topographic map.  Troyan: Manfred Wörner Foundation, 2009.

Notes

References
 Makresh Rocks. SCAR Composite Antarctic Gazetteer
 Bulgarian Antarctic Gazetteer. Antarctic Place-names Commission. (details in Bulgarian, basic data in English)

External links
 Makresh Rocks. Copernix satellite image

Rock formations of Robert Island
Bulgaria and the Antarctic